The National Pushkin Museum ( - literally the 'All-Russian Museum of A. S. Pushkin') is a museum dedicated to the life and work of Russian poet Alexander Pushkin. It is located in Saint Petersburg, Russia. The museum was established in 1953 on the basis of the All-Russian Pushkin Exhibition of 1937 which opened in Moscow.

The exhibition was opened in the Alexander Palace in the town of Pushkin in 1949. Later the exhibition was transferred to 17 halls of the Winter Palace, and in 1999 a new literary exposition entitled A. S. Pushkin: Life and Work was opened in 18 halls of the house at 12 Moika River Embankment, the last accommodation of Alexander Pushkin. The Pushkin Museum contains over 200,000 artifacts, including memorabilia, books and works of art related to Pushkin.

See also
 List of museums in Saint Petersburg

References
St Petersburg Encyclopedia article
The All-Russian Pushkin Museum

Museums established in 1953
Pushkin
Literary museums in Saint Petersburg